Secret Treaties is the third studio album by American rock band Blue Öyster Cult, released on April 5, 1974 by Columbia. It features the same band members and production team as their previous album. 

The album spent 14 weeks in the US album charts, peaking at No. 53. It was certified gold by the RIAA in 1992.

In 1975, a poll of readers of the British magazine Melody Maker voted Secret Treaties the "Top Rock Album of All Time". In 2010, Rhapsody called it one of the all-time best "proto-metal" albums.

All of the songs from the album found their way into BÖC playlists over the following years, except for "Cagey Cretins". It's the only BÖC album that does not feature a track with lead vocals sung by guitarist Donald "Buck Dharma" Roeser. The band also did not write any of the lyrics to the album, handing that duty to producer Sandy Pearlman, rock critic Richard Meltzer and singer Patti Smith.

Cover art
The cover, with art by Ron Lesser, depicts the band standing beside and sitting on a German Me-262 fighter aircraft; this scene is inspired by the song of the same name.

While the LP cover has the band name in red (a darker red on the Japanese LP), on the CD it is in lime green.

Songs
Lyrics to the lead-off track "Career of Evil" were written by future punk poet Patti Smith, a longtime contributor to the band (and, at the time, girlfriend of BÖC keyboardist and rhythm guitarist Allen Lanier).

A few changes were made to "Career of Evil" on the single version. The vocals are different: only Eric Bloom is heard for most of the song, instead of Bloom and Albert Bouchard singing together. Also, one verse was removed ("Pay me..." to "...kneeling in the rain"). Part of the bridge was changed also, presumably to make the song more acceptable to radio: "do it to your daughter" became "do it like you ought to." The line "I want your wife to be my baby tonight" was changed to "I want your life to be mine, maybe tonight".

The transition between the tracks "Harvester of Eyes" and "Flaming Telepaths" is marked by a piece of classical music played on a music box. Members of the band recall that it was something the sound engineer had found on an unlabeled recording, but they could not identify it. The piece and its composer were uncredited on the album. It has since been identified as an excerpt from a waltz by Ion Ivanovici called Waves of the Danube (Donauwellen). The source of the original recording remains a mystery.

"Career of Evil" was the inspiration for the title of the 2015 novel of the same name written by J.K. Rowling under the pen name Robert Galbraith.

The compilation Don't Fear the Reaper: The Best of Blue Öyster Cult contains a version of "Flaming Telepaths" without the music box intro. The original version with the complete sound effects is found on the compilation Workshop of the Telescopes.

The psychedelic folk group Espers covers "Flaming Telepaths" on their CD The Weed Tree in 2005.

Release history
In addition the conventional 2 channel stereo version the album was also released in a 4 channel quadraphonic version on LP record and 8-track tape in 1974. The quad LP release was encoded in the SQ matrix system.

The album was reissued on the Super Audio CD format in 2016 by Audio Fidelity. This edition contains both the stereo and quad mixes.

Track listing

Personnel
Band members
Eric Bloom – vocals, rhythm guitar, keyboards
Donald "Buck Dharma" Roeser – lead guitar
Allen Lanier – keyboards, rhythm guitar, synthesizers, second lead guitar on track 11
Joe Bouchard – bass, vocals
Albert Bouchard – drums, vocals

Production
Murray Krugman, Sandy Pearlman – producers
Tim Geelan, Jerry Smith – engineers
Lehman Yates, Lou Schlossberg – recording
John Berg – cover design
Bruce Dickinson – production (2001 remaster)
Thom Cadley – mixing on tracks 10 and 11 (2001 remaster)
Vic Anesini – remastering (2001 remaster)

Charts

Certifications

Accolades

References

Blue Öyster Cult albums
1974 albums
Albums produced by Murray Krugman
Albums produced by Sandy Pearlman
CBS Records albums